Niebla (English: Fog) is a Mexican telenovela produced by Televisa and broadcast by Telesistema Mexicano in 1961.

Cast 
 Amparo Rivelles
 Ernesto Alonso
 Prudencia Griffel
 Susana Cabrera
 Luis Bayardo
 Bertha Moss
 Judy Ponte
 Jana Kleinburg
 Ramón Bugarini

References

External links 

Mexican telenovelas
1961 telenovelas
Televisa telenovelas
1961 Mexican television series debuts
1961 Mexican television series endings
Spanish-language telenovelas